Edgar Julius Jung (pen name: Tyll; 6 March 1894 – 1 July 1934) was a German lawyer born in Ludwigshafen in the Kingdom of Bavaria. He was a leader of the conservative revolutionary movement in Germany which stood not only in opposition to the Weimar Republic, whose parliamentarian system he considered decadent and foreign-imposed, but he was also opposed to Nazism. He was murdered by the Nazis in the 1934 Night of the Long Knives purge.

Career
At the onset of World War I, Jung voluntarily joined the imperial armies and reached the rank of lieutenant. After the war, he participated in the suppression of the Bavarian Soviet Republic in the spring of 1919 and in the resistance against the French occupation of the Palatinate, during which he participated in the assassination of Franz Josef Heinz. Expelled by the French authorities, Jung moved to Munich, where in 1925 he opened a law firm and dampened his political activism slightly.

Like Carl Schmitt, Jung believed the breakdown of liberal parliamentarism to be inevitable as the instability of Weimar Germany was unfolding before his eyes. Jung regarded Weimar Germany as teetering on the brink of revolutionary turmoil with the very real prospect of a "Red Revolution" sponsored by the Soviet Union or a "Brown Revolution" by the Nazis.

After the formation of the "government of national concentration" under the leadership of Adolf Hitler on 30 January 1933, Jung became a political consultant and speechwriter for the vice-chancellor of the coalition cabinet, Franz von Papen.

Marburg speech
In 1934, Jung wrote the Marburg speech that was delivered on 17 June by Papen at the University of Marburg. The speech articulated the conservative establishment's criticism of the violence of Nazism. The text sought to reassert the Christian foundation of the state and the need to avoid agitation and propaganda: "It is time", the speech declared, "to join together in fraternal friendship and respect for all our fellow countrymen, to avoid disturbing the labours of serious men and to silence fanatics". The speech was banned by the NSDAP from being printed in the press.

Death
Hitler personally ordered the arrest of Jung. He was arrested in his Berlin apartment by the Gestapo; he had been packing bags in an attempt to flee to Switzerland. Jung was transferred to Gestapo headquarters at Prinz-Albrecht-Straße.

Jung was murdered by the SS during the Night of the Long Knives, being shot in the cellar at Gestapo headquarters. His body was found dumped in a ditch near the town of Oranienburg near Berlin on 1 July.

Works
The Rule of the Inferiour: Its Disintegration and Removal Through a New Reich is his major political treatise which was originally published in 1930 as Die Herrschaft der Minderwertigen, ihr Zerfall und ihre Ablösung durch ein neues Reich ("Inferiour" is an obsolete spelling of "Inferior"). The translator, Alexander Jacob, produced the first and only English edition in 1995 with a large introduction and notes, sold in two volumes; the first volume being 428 pages and the second 396 pages.

In Sinndeutung der deutschen Revolution (1933), written less than year before he was murdered by the Nazis, Jung declared that "violence is an element of life" and that "a nation that has become incapable of employing violence must be suspected of biological decline."

See also 
 Herbert von Bose
 Erich Klausener

References

Further reading 
 .
 
 Mosley, Michael Lee (1987) Metaphysical revenge: The ideas and life of Edgar Julius Jung. Miami.
 Orth, Rainer (2016) "Der Amtssitz der Opposition"?: Politik und Staatsumbaupläne im Büro des Stellvertreters des Reichskanzlers in den Jahren 1933–1934. Böhlau, Cologne.

External links 
 "The Neo-Conservative Reich of Edgar Julius Jung" by Alexander Jacob in The Scorpion
 Biography from the Germany History Museum's site 
 Biography 

1894 births
1934 deaths
People from Ludwigshafen
20th-century German lawyers
German People's Party politicians
Conservative Revolutionary movement
Victims of the Night of the Long Knives
German Army personnel of World War I
People from the Palatinate (region)
People from Rhineland-Palatinate executed by Nazi Germany
People executed by Nazi Germany by firearm
Military personnel of Bavaria
Roman Catholics in the German Resistance
20th-century Freikorps personnel
Jurists from Rhineland-Palatinate